Seth Pollak is College of Letters and Science Distinguished Professor of Psychology and an Investigator in the Social and Affective Processes Unit of the Waisman Center at the University of Wisconsin–Madison.  He specializes in developmental psychopathology, focusing on the neuropsychology of emotion, particularly the role that early experience plays in the development of brain structure and psychological functioning.  Pollak received a B.A. from Franklin and Marshall College, an M.A. from Harvard University, and a Ph.D. from the University of Rochester.  He is married to fellow psychologist Jenny Saffran.

References

External links
Seth Pollak's Homepage
Biography

Year of birth missing (living people)
Living people
21st-century American psychologists
Harvard University alumni
University of Rochester alumni
University of Wisconsin–Madison faculty
Franklin & Marshall College alumni